Dialectica soffneri is a moth of the family Gracillariidae. It is known from Austria, Bulgaria, Hungary and Greece.

References

Dialectica (moth)
Moths of Europe
Moths described in 1965